The Synlestidae are a family of damselflies
commonly known as sylphs or malachites. They occur in South Africa, Australia, and South America.

Description
These damselflies are 21 to 36 millimeters long, with slender abdomens. Species are generally metallic green to brown-tinged black in color.

Biology
Damselflies of this family are predators. The nymphs live in rivers and streams, and can be found in stagnant pools during the dry season.

Systematics
There are nine extant genera. There are also several extinct genera known from fossils.

Genera include:

Chlorolestes 
Ecchlorolestes 
Episynlestes 
Megalestes 
Nubiolestes 
Phylolestes 
Sinolestes 
Synlestes

References

 
Odonata families
Odonata of Asia
Odonata of Africa
Odonata of Australia
Odonata of South America
Taxa named by Robert John Tillyard
Damselflies